Communist Party of Bangladesh may refer to one of a number of political parties in Bangladesh:

Communist Party of Bangladesh
Communist Party of Bangladesh (Marxist)
Communist Party of Bangladesh (Marxist–Leninist) (Barua)
Communist Party of Bangladesh (Marxist–Leninist) (Dutta)
Communist Party of Bangladesh (Marxist–Leninist) (Umar)
Bangladesh Communist Party (Leninist)

See also
 Communist Party (disambiguation)